The AQM-37 Jayhawk (originally designated the Beech KD2B) is an air-launched supersonic target drone manufactured by Beechcraft capable of simulating inbound ICBM warhead packages for fleet shoot-down exercises.

Development

AQM-37

In 1959, the US Navy and US Air Force issued a joint request for a new high-speed expendable target. Beechcraft won the competition, and the result was a small delta-winged drone with wingtip fins and a liquid rocket motor, originally designated XKD2B-1 but now known as the AQM-37. The type first flew in May 1961, entered service with the US Navy in 1963, and remains in service.

The original version was the AQM-37A or Beech Model 1019. The AQM-37A was followed by a confusing list of subvariants, some of which were new production, others which were modifications of existing AQM-37s. These variants were intended to simulate different classes of threats, such as sea-skimming antiship missiles or high-altitude naval attack missiles, or provide better performance. One high-performance variant with improved thermal protection attained a speed of Mach 4.7 and an altitude of over 112,000 feet (34 kilometers) on a ballistic trajectory. The final US Navy variant was designated AQM-37C.

After an evaluation of the AQM-37A in the late 1960s, the US Army bought a small initial batch of Model 1100/1101 AQM-37As that, unlike other variants, were recoverable, using a parachute system. Some of this batch were intended for low-altitude operation and fitted with a radar altimeter, and others were intended for high-altitude operation and had a barometric altimeter. The Army later ordered over 400 improved non-recoverable Model 1102 variants of the AQM-37A.

The USAF evaluated the AQM-37 in the early 1970s but was slow to adopt it. Records of USAF procurement of the type are sketchy, but it does seem to be currently part of the Air Force target inventory. Small quantities of AQM-37s were also sold to Italy, Israel, and France, while Shorts in Britain built under licence several hundred of the type as the Shorts SD.2  Stiletto. The Meteor company of Italy built a number of AQM-37s under license.

All variants are air-launched, with the US Navy traditionally using the F-4 Phantom for the job and the British using the Canberra.

More than 5,000 AQM-37 targets of all variants have been delivered since the early 1960s. On 22 September 2022 the U.S. Navy conducted the final AQM-37 target launch.

The AQM-37's engine is built by Rocketdyne, though in some sources it is credited to Harley Davidson, the motorcycle manufacturer, which appears to be due to a sequence of company buyouts. The engine uses "storable" liquid propellants, in contrast to cryogenic propellants like liquid oxygen and liquid hydrogen that have to be loaded up just before launch lest they evaporate away. The problem is that the storable propellants in common use are corrosive, highly toxic, and "hypergolic", meaning that the propellants spontaneously ignite when mixed together. This tends to make them troublesome to deal with.

AQM-81A Firebolt

As a result, in the late 1960s the Air Force investigated an alternate propulsion scheme for the AQM-37 under project "Sandpiper". The program involved fitting a few AQM-37As with "hybrid" engines that used solid fuel with storable nitric acid oxidizer. The tests were judged promising, and so the Air Force went on to establish a "High Altitude Supersonic Target (HAST)" program in the 1970s. HAST suffered various difficulties, and it wasn't until 1979 that a contract was awarded to Teledyne Ryan for the Model 305 / AQM-81A Firebolt.

The first Firebolt flew on 13 June 1983, launched from an Eglin AFB, Florida, F-4D Phantom II. The new target looked very much like the AQM-37, but had the hybrid rocket engine. The flight test program was completed, but then the HAST effort stalled completely, and the AQM-81A never went into production.

Variants
Model 1019Designated AQM-37A by the United States Military.
Model 1072United Kingdom variant.
Short StilettoThe Beech Model 1072 modified by Shorts for UK use.
Model 1088Italian variant.
Model 1094French variant.
Model 1100Fitted with a two-stage recovery parachute for the US Army.
Model 1101Fitted with a two-stage recovery parachute for the US Army.
Model 1102(AQM-37A)Fitted non recoverable version for the US Army.
XKD2B-1Prototype targets.
KD2B-1US Navy designation before the joint designation scheme was introduced.
AQM-37ADesignation of the KD2B-1 after the joint designation system was introduced.
AQM-37BNot officially used after orders from the US Navy were changed to the AQM-37C.
AQM-37CUS Navy
AQM-37DUpgraded electrical systems and avionics for higher reliability.
Teledyne Ryan AQM-81A FireboltDeveloped for the USAF from the AQM-37 by introducing solid rocket fuel with liquid oxidiser (RFNA), for improved safety and performance. Beechcraft submissions were rejected as too expensive, so development contracts were awarded to Teledyne-Ryan
Teledyne Ryan AQM-81B A US Navy version not pursued.
Q-12US Air Force designation for the KD2B before the joint designation scheme was introduced.

Surviving aircraft 

 AQM-37 on display at the Aviation Unmanned Vehicle Museum in Caddo Mills, Texas.

Specifications (AQM-37C)

References 

Directory of U.S. Rockets and Missiles - AQM-37
Directory of U.S. Rockets and Missiles - AQM-81
This article contains material that originally came from the web article Unmanned Aerial Vehicles by Greg Goebel, which exists in the Public Domain.

AQM-37
1960s United States special-purpose aircraft
Target drones of the United States
Rocket-powered aircraft
Canard aircraft
Delta-wing aircraft
Raytheon Company products